Ryan Belleville (born May 8, 1979)  is a Canadian stand-up comedian and actor.

Career
Belleville became the youngest person to tape his own Comedy Now! special for CTV. He also appeared in CBC's The Sean Cullen Show and the film Going the Distance. He was also "Slime Master Ryan" on the YTV series Uh Oh! Belleville portrayed Eddie in the 2004 Disney Channel Original Movie Stuck in the Suburbs and had a starring role in 2008 as Finn in Finn on the Fly.  

In 2011, he co-wrote and starred in the Canadian sitcom, Almost Heroes. He also voices Holger Holghart in the Teletoon animated show Detentionaire. He played the recurring character Jasper on the Fox TV series Life on a Stick, and also appeared on the CTV show, Satisfaction.

Stand-up comedy
Belleville won the Phil Hartman Award and won a Canadian Comedy Award. He has appeared eight times at the Just for Laughs comedy festival in Montreal, several times at the Winnipeg Comedy Festival and the Halifax Comedy Fest.

In June 2016 Belleville produced and co-hosted a 12-hour telethon, with proceeds going to the Canadian Red Cross to help the victims of the Fort McMurray wildfires.

Personal life
Belleville is the brother of Jason Belleville, a writer and producer.

Filmography

Film

Television

References

External links
 

Canadian male film actors
Canadian male television actors
Canadian male voice actors
Canadian stand-up comedians
Male actors from Calgary
Living people
People educated at Western Canada High School
Comedians from Alberta
Canadian Comedy Award winners
1979 births